KZ1 may refer to:

 KZ1 (karting), a 125 cc kart racing class
 KZ1 (yacht), New Zealand's 1988 America's Cup challenger
 Ascari KZ1, a British sports car
 SAI KZ I, a Danish airplane
 Kuaizhou 1 (KZ-1) Chinese solid fuel space rocket

See also
 KZI (disambiguation) 
 KZ (disambiguation)